Jeroom Riske (14 August 1919 – 17 December 2000) was a Belgian gymnast. He competed in seven events at the 1952 Summer Olympics.

References

1919 births
2000 deaths
Belgian male artistic gymnasts
Olympic gymnasts of Belgium
Gymnasts at the 1952 Summer Olympics
Place of birth missing